Haphephobia (also known as aphephobia, haphophobia, hapnophobia, haptephobia, haptophobia, thixophobia, aphenphosmphobia) is a rare specific phobia that involves the fear of touching or of being touched.

Signs and symptoms
As with other phobias and anxiety conditions, haphephobia may come with anxiety and stress-related symptoms that vary among those that suffer from it. A non-exhaustive list of potential symptoms that those suffering from haphephobia may have includes:

Chest pain
Choking sensation
Cold or hot flushes
Cholinergic urticaria
Dissociation
Dizziness
Fear of dying
Fear of loss of control
Feeling of being trapped
Heart palpitations
Hyperventilation
Nausea
Sense of impending danger
Sweating
Tingling and shivering sensations
Trembling

Popular culture
In the 1987 teen film Three O'Clock High, the main antagonist Buddy Revell physically assaults anyone who physically touches him.
In the 1989 manga Berserk, the main character Guts suffers from haphephobia as a result of being raped as a child.
In the 2007 film Lars and the Real Girl, the main character Lars Lindstrom describes being touched by others as a burning sensation, and refuses to allow this for most of the film.
In the 2007 manga Freezing, the main heroine has this phobia due to her traumatic background. This is a very notable case of it.
In the 2012 Nintendo tactical RPG Fire Emblem Awakening, the character Libra suffers from haphephobia as a result of his abusive and neglectful parents.
 In the 2011 erotic novel, “Fifty Shades of Grey”, Christian Grey suffers from haphephobia as a result of childhood abuse (including cigarette burns inflicted on his upper body) and neglect.
In the 2013 novel The Foxhole Court, one of the main characters, Andrew Minyard, suffers from haphephobia due to his abusive childhood spent in foster care. Throughout the trilogy, his condition and his mentality regarding it are explored.
In the 2015 novel "Echoes" by Laura Tisdall, the main character, Mallory Park, suffers from haphephobia, and wears gloves as a result.
In the 2015 film Our Brand Is Crisis, the protagonist, played by Sandra Bullock, suffers from the condition.
In the 2015 TV series Mr. Robot, protagonist Elliot Alderson is strongly implied to suffer from haphephobia, frequently avoiding the touch of others.
In the 2015 novel Six of Crows, protagonist Kaz Brekker suffers from this condition, causing him to wear gloves and take other measures in order to avoid skin contact. His struggles with haphephobia and attempts to overcome it are explored as a subplot throughout the duology.
In the Jack Reacher novel Night School it is revealed his former Sergeant Neagley has haphephobia.
 In the 2019 game Death Stranding, the main character Sam Porter suffers from haphephobia (which is referred to in-game as aphenphosmphobia) and his condition is shown throughout the game.
 In season 17, episode 8 of Grey's Anatomy, "It's All Too Much", a patient with haphephobia is treated by two of the show's characters, Maggie and Winston.
 In Chinese drama series Cute Bodygaurd, the main lead Gu Rong suffers from haphephobia and only goes easy with Su Jingjing. 
 In the 2016 Indonesian novel Jakarta Sebelum Pagi, one of the main characters, Abel suffers from haphepbobia and ligyrophobia.

See also
List of phobias

References 

Phobias

pt:Anexo:Lista de fobias#H